Naum Hristov Shopov (27 July 1930 – 18 April 2012) was a Bulgarian actor. He appeared in more than thirty films since 1960. His son Hristo Shopov is also an actor.

Selected filmography

References

External links

1930 births
2012 deaths
Bulgarian male film actors
People from Stara Zagora